East Timor competed at the 2017 Asian Indoor and Martial Arts Games held in Ashgabat, Turkmenistan from  17 to 27 September. East Timor sent only one participant in the multi-sport event for short course swimming. East Timor couldn't receive any medal in the competition.

East Timor made its debut appearance in an Asian Indoor and Martial Arts Games for the first time in history along with other Oceania nations.

Participants

References 

Asian Indoor and Martial Arts Games
Nations at the 2017 Asian Indoor and Martial Arts Games
2017